Hypobromous acid is a weak, unstable acid with chemical formula of HOBr.  It is mainly produced and handled in an aqueous solution.  It is generated both biologically and commercially as a disinfectant. Salts of hypobromite are rarely isolated as solids.

Synthesis and properties
Addition of bromine to water gives hypobromous acid and hydrobromic acid (HBr) via a disproportionation reaction.

 Br2 + H2O   HOBr + HBr

In nature, hydrobromous acid is produced by bromoperoxidases, which are enzymes that catalyze the oxidation of bromide with hydrogen peroxide:
 Br− + H2O2   HOBr + OH−

Hypobromous acid has a pKa of 8.65 and is therefore only partially dissociated in water at pH 7. Like the acid, hypobromite salts are unstable and undergo a slow disproportionation reaction to yield the respective bromate and bromide salts.

 3 BrO−(aq) →  2 Br−(aq) + (aq)

Its chemical and physical properties are similar to those of other hypohalites.

Uses
HOBr is used as a bleach, an oxidizer, a deodorant, and a disinfectant, due to its ability to kill the cells of many pathogens. The compound is generated in warm-blooded vertebrate organisms especially by eosinophils, which produce it by the action of eosinophil peroxidase, an enzyme which preferentially uses bromide. Bromide is also used in hot tubs and spas as a germicidal agent, using the action of an oxidizing agent to generate hypobromite in a similar fashion to the peroxidase in eosinophils.  
It is especially effective when used in combination with its congener, hypochlorous acid.

References

Hypobromites
Hydrogen compounds
Oxidizing acids
Oxidizing agents
Halogen oxoacids
Triatomic molecules